The 2017 London Sevens was the tenth and final event of the 2016–17 World Rugby Sevens Series and the seventeenth edition of the London Sevens. The tournament was held over the weekend of 20–21 May 2017 at Twickenham in London. 

This was the first tournament in the history of the series with all semifinalists from the Northern Hemisphere, as Scotland, England, Canada, and the United States took out the top four placings. Scotland won the tournament, beating England 12–7 in the final. The USA's Perry Baker was the leading try scorer, notching eight tries over the weekend.

Format
The teams were drawn into four pools of four teams each. Each team played all the others in their pool once. The top two teams from each pool advanced to the Cup quarter finals. The bottom two teams from each group advanced to the Challenge Trophy quarter finals.

Teams
The sixteen participating teams for the tournament were:

Pool stages

Pool A

Pool B

Pool C

Pool D

Knockout stage

13th Place

Challenge Trophy

5th place

Cup

Tournament placings

Source: World Rugby (archived)

External links
Official Site

London Sevens
London
London Sevens
London Sevens
London Sevens